Gordon William Peake (born 26 January 1935) is a former Australian rules footballer who played with Richmond in the Victorian Football League (VFL).

Family
He married Barbara Ann Wing in 1959.

Notes

References
 V.F.A. Final Teams, The Age, (Saturday, 1 October 1960), p.14.
 Davis, Trevor, "Team Triumphs over Difficulties", The Age, (Monday, 3 October 1960), p.22.
 Hogan P: The Tigers Of Old, Richmond FC, (Melbourne), 1996.

External links 
 
 
 Gordon Peake's playing statistics from The VFA Project

Living people
1935 births
Australian rules footballers from Victoria (Australia)
Richmond Football Club players
Oakleigh Football Club players